Catherine Desnitski (27 April 1886 – 3 January 1960) was a Russian noblewoman, a participant in the Russo-Japanese War and the holder of the Cross of St. George (1904). She was the wife of the Siamese prince Chakrabongse Bhuvanath. The story of their love is described in literary works and a ballet by the Kremlin Ballet Company at the Bangkok International Festival of Dance and Music (2003).

Childhood
Desnitski was born Katerina Ivanov Desnitskaya. Her father was Ivan Stepanovich Desnitsky. Born in 1838, to a poor rural deacon, he received his early education in a theological seminary. Later he entered Moscow University, graduating from the Faculty of Law in 1866.

During his studies, despite financial difficulties, he married Karolina Karlovna (Klementievna), née Gecklin (?–1882) a Frenchwoman brought up in the Reformed tradition. They had six children:
 Vladimir (06/05/1867, Moscow – ?)
 Hope (07/29/1869, Nizhny Novgorod – ?)
 Sofia (09/19/1871, Samara – 12/12/1872, Samara)
 Evgenia (11/26/1873, Samara – ?1942)
 Nikolay (October 10, 1875, Samara – ?)
 Alexander (1881, Kiev – ?1943)

Her mother was Maria Mikhailovna Desnitskaya (née Khizhnyakova) (06/20/1851 – winter 1903, Kiev). In 1868, she had graduated with a silver medal from the Poltava Institute of Noble Maidens (now Poltava National Technical University named after Yuri Kondratyuk).

Adult life and marriage

Desnitski became a nurse and served in the 1904–1905 Russo-Japanese War and was awarded a medal.

In 1904, Desnitski met the Siamese Prince of Bishnulok, a son of King Chulalongkorn, who received a military education in St. Petersburg, and was a graduate of the Page Corps.

In 1906 they married in Istanbul's Greek Church of the Holy Trinity. She had a son Chula Chakrabongse on 28 March 1908 and they lived at the Paruskavan Palace in Bangkok.

In 1919, the Prince and Desnitski divorced, but she refused a financial settlement, and left for Shanghai, where her brother had settled and there was a large Russian diaspora. She became involved in charity work there and later married American Harry Clinton Stone. They later moved to Paris, and then Portland, Oregon. Desnitski was buried in Paris.

She met her only granddaughter just once – Narisa Chakrabongse (b. 1956), the daughter of her son Chula Chakrabongse and his English wife Elizabeth Hunter. In 1995, Narisa Chakrabongse, in collaboration with Eileen Hunter (her maternal aunt), published the book Katya and the Prince of Siam.

Narisa maintained good relations with her cousins from the Desnitski family in Paris and St. Petersburg. Her son, Catherine's great-grandson, Hugo Chakrabongse Levy, a musician and composer, is married to Thai actress .

References

External links 
 Екатерина Десницкая оставила сиамского принца.
 История любви русской красавицы и принца Сиама. 

1886 births
1960 deaths
Deaths in Paris
People of the Russo-Japanese War
Catherine Desnitski
Russian expatriates in Thailand
Expatriates in the Rattanakosin Kingdom
20th-century Chakri dynasty